Moon Area High School is a public high school located in the Moon Area School District in Pennsylvania, United States. The school serves students in grades 9-12 from Moon and Crescent, South Heights borough, along with the communities of Glenwillard and Wireton, and several other unincorporated villages. The Moon Area School District's High School and Middle School facilities are located in the center of Moon.

Statewide PSSA Rankings 
High School PSSA standardized tests are administered statewide to public high schools. Moon's rankings are as follows:

2017- 45th of 659
2016- 17th
2015- 23rd
2014- 20th
2013- 17th

Athletics 

Moon High student athletes are able to compete in 13 sports and cheerleading. In most instances, Moon High sports compete in the Western Pennsylvania Interscholastic Athletic League (WPIAL), District VII of the Pennsylvania Interscholastic Athletic Association (PIAA).

Football 
The Moon High football team competes in the WPIAL Class AAAAA Allegheny Six Conference, which is made up of South Fayette, Baldwin, Upper St. Clair, Bethel Park, and Peters Township.

In 1998, Moon Tigers won the WPIAL Class AAA Championship at Three Rivers Stadium in Pittsburgh. Moon defeated Blackhawk 34–7 to claim the title. The Tigers then went on to the PIAA Class AAA Championships in Hershey, only to fall 10–0 to Allentown Central Catholic High School.

Boys Soccer 
In 2003 they beat Thomas Jefferson 2–1 to win the WPIAL AA Championship. In the semi-final game before the championship Moon beat Mars 2–0.

Girls Soccer 
The Moon High girls soccer team won the PIAA AA state title in 2012.

The Moon High girls soccer team won the PIAA AAA state title in 2016, 2017 and 2022.

The Moon High girls soccer team won the PIAA AAAA state title in 2021.

Girls Rugby 
The Moon High girls rugby team won the RugbyPA D2 state title in 2017. 

The Moon High girls rugby team won the RugbyPA D1 state title in 2022.

Swimming & Diving 
The Moon boys swimming team won the state championship in 1980, and the girls team won state titles in 1996 and 1997.

Boys Basketball 
The Moon High boys basketball team made school history, winning three consecutive WPIAL championships – 2004, 2005, 2006. The team was crowned state champions in 2004.

In the 2006–2007 season, Moon entered the WPIAL Class AAAA, but will go back down to WPIAL Class AAA in the 2008–2009 season.

Moon boys' varsity basketball won the WPIAL 5A final March 1, 2017 and won the PIAA 5A final March 22, 2019.

Girls Basketball 
The Moon High ladies basketball team, won the 2002 and 2005 WPIAL championship. The Lady Tigers have also reached the final four of the PIAA state playoffs multiple times.

Gymnastics 

The gymnastics team has won the 2008, 2012, 2013, 2014, 2017, 2018, and 2022  WPIAL district championships.

Notable alumni 
Jodi Applegate, Class of 1982, was an Emmy Award-winning host for Fox 5's Good Day New York; before that she worked at NBC News as co-anchor of Weekend Today and Later Today and at MSNBC covering Princess Diana's funeral and Fox25 in Boston.
John Calipari, Class of 1978, is head coach for University of Kentucky men's basketball team.
Lou Christie, Class of 1961, is a singer/songwriter with popular hits like "Lightnin' Strikes" and "Rhapsody in the Rain."
Brandon Wilson, Class of 1971, is an explorer and Lowell Thomas Award-winning author and photographer of Yak Butter Blues: A Tibetan Trek of Faith (2004, 2005), Dead Men Don't Leave Tips: Adventures X Africa (2005), Along the Templar Trail (2008) and Over the Top & Back Again: Hiking X the Alps (2010).
Bob Davie, Class of 1972, is football head coach for the University of New Mexico, former head coach at Notre Dame and has been a television sports commentator.
Rich Milot, Class of 1975, former linebacker for Penn State 1975–1979 and NFL's Washington Redskins 1979–1987; played in three Super Bowls, (XVII, XVIII, XXII), winning twice in XVII and XXII.
A. Q. Shipley, Class of 2004, is a former Super Bowl winning center for the NFL's Tampa Bay Buccaneers.

External links 
Moon Area School District Website
Moon High Marching Band

References 

Schools in Allegheny County, Pennsylvania
Education in Pittsburgh area
Public high schools in Pennsylvania
Moon Township, Allegheny County, Pennsylvania